Hanging Rock may refer to:

Australia 
 Hanging Rock, New South Wales, a mining village on the Northern Tablelands
 Hanging Rock, Victoria, a rock formation
Picnic at Hanging Rock (novel), a 1967 novel by Australian author Joan Lindsay
Picnic at Hanging Rock (film), a 1975 film adaptation of the novel

United Kingdom 
 Hanging Rock, County Fermanagh, a cliff in Northern Ireland

United States 
 Hanging Rock, Ohio, a village
 Hanging Rock Energy Facility, a natural-gas power plant near Hanging Rock, Ohio
 Hanging Rock, Virginia, an unincorporated community in Roanoke County
 Hanging Rock, West Virginia, an unincorporated community
 Hanging Rock (North Carolina), a mountain in Western North Carolina, also known as Bear's Paw
 Hanging Rock (Upper Merion Township, Pennsylvania), a formation
 Hanging Rock National Natural Landmark, Wabash County, Indiana
 Hanging Rock State Park, a North Carolina State Park in the Piedmont
 Hanging Rock (Wabash River), rock formation overlooking the Wabash River in Wabash County, Illinois

See also
Hanging Rocks, perpendicular cliffs in Hampshire County, West Virginia